AS 314, also known as V452 Scuti, is a protoplanetary nebula once believed to be a white hypergiant star or luminous blue variable located in the constellation of Scutum. It has an apparent magnitude of 9.85 and can be seen with small telescopes.

Characteristics
AS 314 was poorly studied until the year 2000, when Miroshnichenko et al. incorrectly estimated a distance for this star of around 10 kiloparsecs (32,600 light years), a luminosity 160,000 times that of Sun, a radius 200 times the solar radius, and an initial mass of 20 solar masses. It was also estimated to be losing  each year (in other words,  every 50,000 years) through a very strong stellar wind.

AS 314 has an infrared excess, suggesting that it is shrouded in a circumstellar envelope of dust. However, it has not been classified as a bona fide luminous blue variable, but as a candidate.

The Hipparcos parallax and proper motions are large and imply a much closer, and hence less luminous, star. The Hipparcos measurement was later confirmed by the Gaia mission, reclassifying AS 314 as post-AGB star.

References

Protoplanetary nebulae
Scutum (constellation)
Scuti, V452
BD-13 5061
091477
J18392610-1350470
TIC objects